Henry Sarjeant (1829–1912) was a notable New Zealand farmer and benefactor. He was born in Rangeworthy, Gloucestershire, England in 1829.

References

1829 births
1912 deaths
New Zealand farmers
English emigrants to New Zealand